Jean-Claude Dreyfus (born 18 February 1946, in Paris) is a French actor, comedian, and author.

He began his career in film acting in 1973 in the film Comment réussir quand on est con et pleurnichard. Dreyfus is notable for his portrayal of the butcher and main antagonist in the black comedy Delicatessen by Marc Caro and Jean-Pierre Jeunet. He collaborated again with Jeunet and actor Dominique Pinon in the films The City of Lost Children and A Very Long Engagement.

Author

Theater

Filmography

References

External links
 

1946 births
Living people
Male actors from Paris
French male film actors
French male television actors
French male stage actors